Adam Dawson may refer to:
Adam Dawson (colonial administrator), administrator of the English East India Company, served as President of Bengal in the eighteenth century
Adam Dawson (distiller) (1793–1873), Scottish industrialist
Adam Dawson (footballer, born 1912), English footballer, played for Seahouses, Craster, Pegswood Utd, Hull City, Blyth Spartans, Chesterfield, Torquay Utd, Halifax Town, Rochdale, Southport
Adam Dawson (footballer) (born 1992), English footballer
Adam Alexander Dawson (1913–2010), noted film editor